Charles Russell "Chuck" Logan (born April 10, 1943) is a former professional American football tight end who played professionally in the National Football League. He played four seasons for the Pittsburgh Steelers and the St. Louis Cardinals.

References

1943 births
Living people
Players of American football from Chicago
American football tight ends
Northwestern Wildcats football players
Pittsburgh Steelers players
St. Louis Cardinals (football) players